Ioan Grigoraş (born 7 January 1963) is a retired super-heavyweight Greco-Roman wrestler from Romania. He won a silver medal at the 1985 world and 1992 European Championships and bronze medals at the 1992 Olympics and 1990 European Championships.

References

External links
 

1963 births
Living people
Olympic wrestlers of Romania
Wrestlers at the 1992 Summer Olympics
Romanian male sport wrestlers
Olympic bronze medalists for Romania
Olympic medalists in wrestling
Medalists at the 1992 Summer Olympics
European Wrestling Championships medalists
World Wrestling Championships medalists
20th-century Romanian people